The 20-pair colour code is a colour code used in Australia to identify individual conductors in a kind of electrical telecommunication wiring for indoor use, known as twisted pair cables. The colours are applied to the insulation that covers each conductor. The first colour is chosen from one group of five colours.

The combinations are also shown in the table below showing the colour for each wire ("1" and "2") and the pair number.

The Australian standard specifies "Grey" in Tables B2 to B7. There are systems in other countries where "Slate" is used rather than "Grey". This is perceived as a minimisation of confusion between "Green" and "Grey" and their potential abbreviations: "G", "Gr", or "Gre". No such consideration is made for "Black", "Blue", or "Brown", or their potential abbreviations of "B", "Bl", or "Br".

Sources
 www.commsalliance.com.au

See also
 25-pair colour code

Color codes
Telephony equipment
Telecommunications in Australia